Goob may refer to:

 Kudditji Kngwarreye or "Goob" (1938–2017), Australian Aboriginal artist
 The Goob, a 2014 British film
 Michael "Goob" Yagoobian, a character in the 2007 Disney film Meet the Robinsons